Cnemaspis dezwaani is a species of gecko, a lizard in the family Gekkonidae. The species is endemic to Indonesia.

Etymology
The specific name, dezwaani, is in honor of Dutch anthropologist Johannes Pieter Kleiweg de Zwaan.

References

Further reading
Das I (2005). "Revision of the Genus Cnemaspis Strauch, 1887 (Sauria: Gekkonidae), from the Mentawai and Adjacent Archipelagos off Western Sumatra, Indonesia, with the Description of Four New Species". Journal of Herpetology 39 (2): 233–247. (Cnemaspis dezwaani, new species).

Cnemaspis
Reptiles described in 2005